Pind Di Kurhi, also spelled as Pind Di Kudi and Pind Di Kuri, is a 2003 Punjabi romance, comedy and drama film directed by Sukhwant Dhadda, starring Sarbjit Cheema, Sheeba Bhakri and Veena Malik in lead roles.

References 

Punjabi-language Indian films
2000s Punjabi-language films